Unjustified Absence (Italian: Assenza ingiustificata) is a 1939 Italian "white-telephones" comedy film directed by Max Neufeld and starring Alida Valli, Amedeo Nazzari and Lilia Silvi. A girl leaves school to marry a doctor, but becomes annoyed by his constant absences and decides to secretly resume her studies.

It was shot at Cinecittà Studios with sets designed by the art director Gastone Medin.

Cast

References

Bibliography 
Gundle, Stephen. Mussolini's Dream Factory: Film Stardom in Fascist Italy. Berghahn Books, 2013.

External links 

1939 films
Italian comedy films
Italian black-and-white films
1939 comedy films
1930s Italian-language films
Films directed by Max Neufeld
Films shot at Cinecittà Studios
Minerva Film films
1930s Italian films